78th Regiment or 78th Infantry Regiment may refer to:

 78th Regiment of Foot (disambiguation), several units of the British Army
 78th Moplah Rifles, a regiment of the British Indian Army
 78th Infantry Regiment (Imperial Japanese Army)
 78th Independent Infantry Regiment (North Korea)
 78th Field Artillery Regiment, a unit of the US Army

American Civil War:

 78th Illinois Infantry Regiment, a unit of the Union (Northern) Army 
 78th Indiana Infantry Regiment, a unit of the Union (Northern) Army 
 78th New York Infantry Regiment, a unit of the Union (Northern) Army and nicknamed the 78th Highlanders in reference to the British units
 78th Ohio Infantry Regiment, a unit of the Union (Northern) Army 
 78th Pennsylvania Infantry Regiment, a unit of the Union (Northern) Army

See also
 78th Division (disambiguation)
 78 Squadron (disambiguation)